The Sam Willows is an extended play by Singaporean pop band The Sam Willows, released on 12 November 2012 through Sony Music Entertainment Singapore.

Release
On 12 November 2012, the band released their first extended play and made their international debut in 2013 at the annual South by Southwest music festival in Texas.

Track listing

References

2012 EPs
The Sam Willows albums